Coloured Canyon (Arabic الوادي الملون) is a rock formation on Sinai peninsula. It is a labyrinth of rocks, some of them have about 40 meters. The canyon is almost 800 meters long. The nearest town to the canyon is Nuweiba. It is about  90 km north of Dahab.

References

External links 
 Coloured Canyon Colored Pictures
 Dina Tawfik, Coloured Canyon, Sinai – AllSinai.info

Sinai Peninsula